Andrew McDonald may refer to:

Politics
 Andrew McDonald (Australian politician) (born 1955), Australian doctor and politician
 Andrew J. McDonald (born 1966), American judge and politician from Connecticut
 Andy McDonald (politician) (born 1958), British Labour MP for Middlesbrough

Religion
 Andrew McDonald (bishop) (1871–1950), Roman Catholic Archbishop
 Andrew Joseph McDonald (1923–2014), American prelate of the Roman Catholic Church

Sports
 Andrew McDonald (American football) (born 1988), American football player
 Andrew McDonald (coach) (1898–1988), American football and basketball player and coach
 Andrew McDonald (cricketer) (born 1981), Australian cricket coach and former cricketer
 Andrew McDonald (water polo) (born 1955), American Olympic water polo player
 Andy McDonald (footballer) (1885–1967), Australian rules footballer
 Andy McDonald (ice hockey) (born 1977), Canadian professional ice hockey centre and winger 
 Drew McDonald (wrestler) (1955–2015), Scottish professional wrestler
 Drew McDonald (basketball) (born 1996), American basketball player

Fictional
 Andy McDonald (Coronation Street), fictional character on the TV soap opera Coronation Street

See also
 Andrew MacDonald (disambiguation)